John Harding Coham (12 March 1891 – 4 May 1969) was an English professional footballer who made six appearances at outside-left in the Southern League for Southampton in 1911, before spending three seasons in the Scottish Football League with Partick Thistle.

Early life
Coham was born in Southampton and attended St. Mark's Junior School, which was situated adjacent to The Dell, the home of Southampton F.C., before moving to Freemantle School.

Football career
Coham played his youth football with St. Pauls Athletic before joining Eastleigh Athletic of the Hampshire League.
 
He joined Southampton in the summer of 1910, aged 18, and initially played in the reserve team. His first-team debut came on 4 February 1911, when he took the place of Joe Blake at outside-left for the Southern League match against Exeter City, with Blake moving inside in the absence of Harry Brown. Described as a "fleet-footed left-winger", Coham continued to deputise for Blake for the remainder of the season, making five further appearances; of Coham's six first-team matches, four ended in defeats with two draws as the "Saints" struggled to avoid relegation, winning only one match from February onwards.

In the summer of 1911, Coham moved to Scotland to join  Partick Thistle, spending three seasons at Firhill Park before returning to Hampshire in 1914.

References

External links
Football career details

1891 births
Footballers from Southampton
1969 deaths
English footballers
Association football forwards
Eastleigh Athletic F.C. players
Southampton F.C. players
Partick Thistle F.C. players
Southern Football League players
Scottish Football League players